Badminton is a popular sport in India. It is the second-most played sport in India after Cricket. Badminton in India is managed by the Badminton Association of India.

Indian shuttlers P. V. Sindhu, Lakshya Sen, H. S. Prannoy, and the doubles pair of Satwiksairaj Rankireddy-Chirag Shetty are ranked amongst the Top-10 in the current BWF world rankings. Prakash Padukone was the first player from India to achieve the world no. 1 spot in the game, after which Srikanth Kidambi became the second male player to make it to the top spot in April 2018. Saina Nehwal is the first female player from India to achieve the world no. 1 spot, which she did in April 2015, and the first Indian badminton player to win a medal at the Olympic Games. 

P. V. Sindhu is the first Indian to become the badminton World Champion, which she achieved in 2019, and the only badminton player from India to win two consecutive medals at the Olympic Games. 

The most successful doubles player from India is Jwala Gutta, who is the only Indian to have been ranked in the Top-10 of two categories. She peaked at no. 6 with Valiyaveetil Diju in mixed doubles and at no. 10 with Ashwini Ponnappa in women's doubles. 

Other successful players include Pullela Gopichand, Aparna Popat, Syed Modi, Nandu Natekar, Chetan Anand, Parupalli Kashyap, B. Sai Praneeth, Sameer Verma and N. Sikki Reddy.

History 

Prakash Padukone and Pullela Gopichand both won the All England Open in 1980 and 2001 respectively, making them the only Indians to win the prestigious title. 

Saina Nehwal won the bronze medal in the individual women's competition at the 2012 London Olympic Games, the first Olympic medal for the country in badminton. P. V. Sindhu won the second and the third Olympic medals in badminton for India, winning a silver and a bronze medal at the 
2016 Rio Olympics and the 2020 Tokyo Olympics respectively. 

India has won several medals at the BWF World Championships as well, with Prakash Padukone winning the first in 1982. The doubles pairing of Jwala Gutta and Ashwini Ponnappa became the first women to win a medal when they won the bronze in 2011. P. V. Sindhu then won consecutive bronze medals at 2013 and 2014 editions, the first Indian player to do so. Saina Nehwal won a first-ever silver at the 2015 Championships, and then a bronze in 2017. 
P. V. Sindhu won silver in consecutive editions in 2017 and 2018. Sindhu then went on to win the gold at the 2019 BWF World Championships and become the first Indian to ever finish on top of the podium. At the same edition, B. Sai Praneeth medalled in the men's singles after 36 years, clinching the bronze. As a result, for the first time, India won medals in two different disciplines in the same BWF World Championships edition. In 2021, Lakshya Sen won the bronze medal in men's singles while Srikanth Kidambi won the silver, the first time India had two medallists in the same edition in the men's singles discipline. In 2022, Satwiksairaj Rankireddy and Chirag Shetty won India's first World Championship medal in the men's doubles, a bronze. Till date, India has never returned empty handed from the World Championships since 2011. 

At the BWF World Junior Championships, Saina Nehwal is the only gold medalist for India, which she achieved in 2008. At the Badminton Asia Junior Championships, P. V. Sindhu and Lakshya Sen are the only gold medalists for India, winning in their respective categories in 2012 and 2018 respectively.

Summer Olympics

Summer Paralympics

Total medals won by Indian Shuttlers in Major tournaments

Former notable players 
 Prakash Padukone
 Dinesh Khanna
 Syed Modi
 Pullela Gopichand
 Chetan Anand
 Aparna Popat
 Nikhil Kanetkar
 U. Vimal Kumar
 Sanave Thomas
 P. V. V. Lakshmi

See also
 Badminton Association of India
 India national badminton team
 Indian National Badminton Championships

References

 
Sport in India